John Hodgkin may refer to:

John Hodgkin (barrister) (1800–1875), English barrister and Quaker preacher
John Hodgkin (tutor) (1766–1845), English tutor, grammarian, and calligrapher

See also
John Hodgkins (died 1560), English suffragan bishop